Baikuris is an extinct genus of ant in the Formicidae subfamily Sphecomyrminae, and is currently placed in the tribe Sphecomyrmini.  The genus contains four described species: the type species Baikuris mandibularis, along with Baikuris casei, Baikuris maximus, and Baikuris mirabilis.

History and classification
The type species B. mandibularis along with B. mirabilis were identified from adults preserved as inclusion in Taimyr amber. The fossils of both species were collected on an expedition to the Taimyr peninsula.  The ambers of the peninsula occur in the upper levels of the Kheta Formation, which is exposed in a number of locations in the Taimyr region. Age estimates of the Kheta Formation are between the Coniacian and Santonian, and the ambers are found consistently in the upper most units, giving a Santonian age range for the inclusions.  Based on the flora and fauna of the Ledyanaya and Mutino Formations which surround the Kheta formation, the paleoforest likely has a humid and warm temperate climate with the tees growing along river banks.  While the resin producing trees have not been identified, the resins were likely dropped into the river systems and buried quickly in deltaic sediments.

Both the holotype and the second specimen for B. casei are adult males which have been preserved as inclusions in transparent chunks of New Jersey amber.  The amber specimens were recovered from deposits of the South Amboy Fire Clay, part of the Raritan Formation. New Jersey amber has been dated to approximately 90 to 94 mya, placing it in the Turonian of the Late Cretaceous.  Analysis of the amber composition indicates it originated as cupressaceous resins which were deposited in lagoons and salt water marshes along the Cretaceous eastern seaboard.

The fossil of B. maximus was discovered preserved as an inclusion in a transparent chunk of Charentese amber.  The amber is thought to have been formed from resins of the extinct Pinales tree family Cheirolepidiaceae and possibly from the living family Araucariaceae.  Paleoecology based on Charentese amber inclusions indicate a shore line mangrove type forest that was of a subtropical to warm temperate climate, with occasional dry periods.  The amber specimens are recovered from deposits exposed in quarries, road constructions, and beach exposures in the Charente-Maritime region of coastal France, notably at Archingeay.  Dating of the amber has been done through pollen analysis and it is generally accepted to be approximately 100 million years old.

An additional amber specimen with partial fossils of six males of an unidentified species was described in 2013.  The amber was recovered from sediments of the Black Creek Formation along the Neuse River in North Carolina.  Dating of the formation places the amber age between 83.6 and 72.1 million years old, in the Campanian.  These males are the youngest occurrence of Baikurus identified, and they are of similar age to the Canadian Grassy Lake amber, though Baikurus has not been found in that amber.  Both the North Carolina and B. casei males are preserved as groups of winged males, indicating that the genus displayed colonial behavior and likely had daytime nuptial fights similar to modern ants.

Description

The genus is known from adult males preserved in amber only. All species of Baikuris have kidney to oval shaped eyes.  The narrow mandibles have a chewing edge that are parallel to each other and lacking teeth.  At the base of the outer mandible surface is a ridge and oval area that may be the opening for the mandibular gland.  The labial palps, visible on the B. casei fossil, have four segments, while the maxillary palps are elongated and have six segments each. On both the mid and hind leg sets, the end of the femurs have developed into additional trochantellus segments.

B. casei
Unlike males of B. mandibularis and B. miribilis, the compound eyes of B. casei are oval in shape. Also in contrast, B. casei fore-wings do not have any crossveins between the cells 1r and 2r. The antennae have 13 segment total, with segment three being the longest and the pedicel being the shortest.

The specific epithet casei was coined in honor of Gerard R. Case, who collected New Jersey amber from a number of localities between 1962 and 1986 and who worked to get the ambers studied in depth.

B. mandibularis
The three males described are all included in a single piece of amber labeled PIN 3730/5. The approximately  fore wings of the holotype show several areas of folding and deformation. The area of the fore wing extending from the wing tip to the apex of the pterostigma curves away from the body towards the amber surface. The lower edge of the wing on the apical side of the anal vein is curved in towards the body.

B. maximus

There is also a distinct downward projection on the underside of the petiole node. The clypeus and mandibles are partially obscured and details difficult to distinguish. The mandibles seem to be small, with straight sides and having a small tooth just below the tip end.

The species name was taken from the Latin maximus, which translates as "biggest" in reference to the size of the species.

B. mirabilis
This Taimyr species is described from a single partial male in amber specimen PIN 3730/8. The wings are preserved, though the veination is faint in many areas, such as the r-rs vein and the 3cu vein. As a result of cleavages both the base and tip areas of the left fore wing are missing. The right wing is complete and distinct, despite the inward curving of the wing tip area. There are at least twelve hamuli on the wing, but fissures obscure the wing so a total number cannot be determined.

Baikuris incertae sedis
The fossils from North Carolina have a mix of features seen in both the two Taimyr amber species and in B. casei.  Like B. mirabilis and B. mandibularis the costal vein in the fore wing extends to the pterostigma, while it does not it B. casei.  The eyes of the North Carolina fossils are oval in outline though, which is only seen in B. casei and not the Taimyr amber species.  Unlike any of the other Baikuris species, the North Carolina fossils have short labial and long maxillary palps. The combination of characters is not seen in any of the other species, and they were not placed into a new species in the 2013 paper.

References

External links

Sphecomyrminae
Cretaceous insects
Fossil ant genera
Fossil taxa described in 1987
Fossil taxa described in 1997
Fossil taxa described in 2015
Prehistoric insects of North America
Cretaceous insects of Asia
Taimyr amber
New Jersey amber